Miss Brazil is a Brazilian beauty pageant that has been held annually since 1954.

Titleholders

Gallery

Winners by state

Notes

References

Miss Brazil titleholders
Miss Brazil titleholders
Miss Brazil titleholders